The Dutch Eredivisie in the 1975–76 season was contested by 18 teams. PSV won the championship.

League standings

Results

Season statistics

Top scorers

See also
 1975–76 Eerste Divisie
 1975–76 KNVB Cup

References

 Eredivisie official website - info on all seasons 
 RSSSF

Eredivisie seasons
Netherlands
1